Estrapronicate, also known as estradiol nicotinate propionate is an estrogen medication and estrogen ester which was never marketed. It was studied as a component of the experimental tristeroid combination drug Trophobolene, which contained nandrolone decanoate, estrapronicate, and hydroxyprogesterone heptanoate.

See also
 List of estrogen esters § Estradiol esters
 Estrapronicate/hydroxyprogesterone heptanoate/nandrolone undecanoate

References

Abandoned drugs
Estradiol esters
Estranes
Nicotinate esters
Synthetic estrogens